Richie Hall (born October 4, 1960) is the defensive coordinator for the Winnipeg Blue Bombers of the Canadian Football League. He was formerly the head coach of the Edmonton Eskimos from 2009 to 2010.

Early years 
Hall was born October 4, 1960, in San Antonio, Texas. He was in a car accident as a child that catapulted him through the windshield of the car and nearly killed him, leaving him with permanent scars above his right eye.

He was a star two-way American football player in high school despite his height of just .

Playing career 
Hall was a walk on college football player at Colorado State University, where he majored in social work.

Hall originally signed with the Stampeders in May 1983 and, in his rookie season, was a CFL All-Star defensive back playing in 16 games recording four interceptions and two fumble recoveries. He also returned 50 punts on special teams for 561 yards including one touchdown and one kickoff return for 12 yards. He earned West Division All-Star honours in the 1986 CFL season for his defensive work recording 4 sacks, 8 interceptions for 116 yards, and 1 fumble recovery for 50 yards. He also returned 16 punts that year for 260 yards.

He was traded to the Roughriders in May 1988 for a fourth-round pick in the 1989 CFL Draft and returned as a 1988 CFL season and 1990 CFL season West Division All-Star.

In all, he appeared in 153 career regular-season games between 1983 and 1991 playing both defensive back and punt returner, was a four-time West Division all-star, a League All-Star in 1983, a Grey Cup champion in 1989, and was selected for the Tom Pate Memorial Award in 1990.

After being released by the Roughriders, Hall used his social work degree and got a job at Regina's Cornwall Alternative School for high-risk kids and joined Regina's Archbishop M.C. O'Neill High School football coaching staff in 1993 before embarking on his professional coaching career.

Coaching career 
In 1994, Hall was hired by the Roughriders to coach their defensive backfield and worked his way up to defensive coordinator by 2000. He gained a reputation as one of the top minds for defensive schemes in the CFL and served as Saskatchewan's defensive coordinator for eight years including the 95th Grey Cup victory for Saskatchewan in 2007. His 2008 Saskatchewan Roughriders defence finished the season with the best in fewest yards allowed (354 per game), second in pass defence (266 yards per game) and fewest passing TDs allowed (28) and third in fewest TDs (44) and points allowed (25.1 per game).

Hall interviewed for at least seven head coaching positions beginning after the 2004 CFL season and, on December 17, 2008, Hall was hired as the head coach for the Edmonton Eskimos, the first black head coach in the Edmonton Eskimos history. When looking for a new coach, Eskimos General Manager Danny Maciocia said he asked his quarterbacks to name the toughest defensive co-ordinator they've played against and was given the unanimous response of Richie Hall.

Hall has said that he wants his players to enjoy the game, work hard, appreciate everything, and take nothing for granted. "I want our players to have a selfless attitude. I want them to be there for each other," Hall said. "I like to think football is a way for them to live their lives."

During his first training camp as head coach, arguably the most competitive battle was between Tumbo Abanikanda and Mark Restelli for the starting weakside linebacker spot. Hall stated that he hoped the battle would end when,"one player outperforms the other player". Eventually, Abanikanda was released with Restelli winning the job.

On November 12, 2010, Hall was fired as the Eskimos head coach after two seasons coaching the team.

On February 1, 2011, it was announced that Hall had rejoined the Roughriders as their defensive coordinator.

Hall was hired as the defensive coordinator for the Winnipeg Blue Bombers on January 20, 2015.

CFL coaching record

References

Further reading 
 

1960 births
Living people
African-American coaches of Canadian football
American players of Canadian football
Calgary Stampeders players
Canadian football defensive backs
Colorado State Rams football players
Edmonton Elks coaches
Sportspeople from San Antonio
Saskatchewan Roughriders players
Saskatchewan Roughriders coaches
Winnipeg Blue Bombers coaches
21st-century African-American people
20th-century African-American sportspeople
Players of American football from San Antonio
Players of Canadian football from San Antonio